The 2000 World Fencing Championships were held in Budapest, Hungary. The event took place from June 29 to July 2, 2000, for competitions in women's team sabre and women's individual sabre, both of which were not held at the 2000 Summer Olympics.

Medal summary

Medal table

See also 
 Fencing at the 2000 Summer Olympics

References
FIE Results

World Fencing Championships
W
World Fencing Championships, 2000
International sports competitions in Budapest
F
2000s in Budapest
June 2000 sports events in Europe
July 2000 sports events in Europe